Samuel Hood, 1st Viscount Hood  (12 December 1724 – 27 January 1816) was an admiral in the Royal Navy. As a junior officer he saw action during the War of the Austrian Succession. He held senior command as Commander-in-Chief, North American Station and then as Commander-in-Chief, Leeward Islands Station, leading the British fleet to victory at Battle of the Mona Passage in April 1782 during the American Revolutionary War. He went on to be Commander-in-Chief, Portsmouth, then First Naval Lord and, after briefly returning to the Portsmouth command, became Commander-in-Chief, Mediterranean Fleet during the French Revolutionary Wars. His younger brother was Admiral Alexander Hood, 1st Viscount Bridport (1726–1814), and his first cousin once-removed was Admiral Sir Samuel Hood, 1st Baronet (1762–1814).

Early life

Childhood
The eldest son of Samuel Hood, vicar of Butleigh in Somerset and prebendary of Wells, and Mary Hoskins, daughter of Richard Hoskins, Esquire, of Beaminster, Dorset. In 1740, Captain (later Admiral) Thomas Smith was stranded in Butleigh when his carriage broke down on the way to Plymouth. The Rev Samuel Hood rescued him and gave him hospitality for the night. Samuel and his younger brother Alexander were inspired by his stories of the sea and he offered to help them in the Navy. The Rev Samuel Hood and his wife would not allow any more sons to join the Navy as "they might be drowned". Their third son Arthur William became Vicar of Butleigh but died of fever in his 30s. Another son drowned in the local River Brue as a boy.

Early career
Samuel entered the Royal Navy in 1741. He had opportunities to see service in the North Sea during the War of the Austrian Succession. In 1754, he was made commander of the sloop  and served in her at the North American station. In July 1756, while still on the North American station, Hood was promoted post captain, and assigned command of the sloop , which was then under construction in England; however as Hood remained in North America he was unable to assume command of Lively.

Seven Years' War

At the outbreak of the Seven Years' War in 1756, the navy was rapidly expanded which benefited Hood. His zeal attracted the favourable notice of the Admiralty and he was appointed to a ship of his own, . During the war, his services were wholly in the Channel, and he was engaged under Rodney in 1759 in the Raid on Le Havre, destroying the vessels collected by the French to serve as transports in the proposed invasion of Britain.

He was appointed in Commander-in-Chief, North American Station in July 1767. He returned to England in October 1770 and commissioned the building of Catherington House in the village of Catherington in Hampshire in 1771. In 1778, he accepted a command which in the ordinary course would have terminated his active career, becoming Commissioner of the dockyard at Portsmouth and governor of the Naval Academy.

American Revolutionary War

In 1778, on the occasion of the King's visit to Portsmouth, Hood was made a baronet. The war was deeply unpopular with much of the British public and navy. Many admirals had declined to serve under Lord Sandwich, the First Lord of the Admiralty. Admiral Rodney, who then commanded in the West Indies, had complained of a lack of proper support from his subordinates, whom he accused of disaffection. The Admiralty, anxious to secure the services of trustworthy flag officers, promoted Hood to rear-admiral on 26 September 1780, and sent him to the West Indies to act as second in command under Rodney, who knew him personally. He joined Rodney in January 1781 in his flagship , and remained in the West Indies or on the coast of North America until the close of the American Revolutionary War.

The expectation that he would work harmoniously with Rodney was not entirely justified. Their correspondence shows that they were not on friendly terms; but Hood always did his duty, and he was so able that no question of removing him from the station ever arose. The unfortunate turn for the British taken by the campaign of 1781 was largely due to Rodney's neglect of Hood's advice.

Battle of the Chesapeake

When Rodney decided to return to Britain for the sake of his health in the autumn of 1781, Hood was ordered to take the bulk of the fleet to the North American coast during the hurricane months. Hood joined Admiral Thomas Graves in the unsuccessful effort to relieve the army at Yorktown, when the British fleet was driven off by the French Admiral, the Comte de Grasse, at the Battle of the Chesapeake.

When he returned to the West Indies, he was for a time in independent command, as commander-in-chief of the Leeward Islands Station, owing to Rodney's absence in England. De Grasse attacked the British islands of St Kitts and Nevis with a force much superior to Hood's squadron. Hood made an unsuccessful attempt in January 1782 to save them from capture, with 22 ships to 29, and the series of bold movements by which he first turned the French out of their anchorage at Basseterre of St Kitts and then beat off their attacks, were one of the best accomplishments of any British admiral during the war.

Battle of the Saintes

On 12 April 1782 Hood took part in a British fleet under Rodney, which defeated a combined French and Spanish fleet that was planning an invasion of Jamaica. The French commander De Grasse, who had been responsible for the victory at Chesapeake, was captured and taken back to Britain as a prisoner.

Battle of the Mona Passage

Eventually Hood was ordered to chase, and with his division of 12 ships he captured 4 ships at the Mona Passage on 19 April 1782, thus completing the defeat. While serving in the Caribbean, Hood became acquainted with, and later became a mentor to, Horatio Nelson, who was a young frigate captain. Hood had been a friend of Nelson's uncle Maurice Suckling. In 1782 Hood introduced Nelson to the Duke of Clarence, the future King William IV, who was then a serving naval officer in New York.

Peace

Hood was made an Irish peer as Baron Hood of Catherington in September 1782. During the peace, he entered the British Parliament as Member for Westminster in the election of 1784 where he was a supporter of the government of William Pitt the Younger. He became Commander-in-Chief, Portsmouth in 1786, after being promoted to vice-admiral on 24 September 1787, retired from the Portsmouth Command in 1789. He was appointed to the Board of Admiralty under John Pitt, 2nd Earl of Chatham, brother of the Prime Minister, in July 1788 and became First Naval Lord in August 1789. He became Commander-in-Chief, Portsmouth again in June 1792.

Hood presided at the court-martial of some of surviving instigators of the mutiny on the Bounty, beginning on 12 September 1792. Among those on trial were crew members who were loyal to Bountys commanding officer, William Bligh, but were forced to remain on the ship after Bligh was cast away in an open boat. Of the ten defendants, four were acquitted and the remaining six were found guilty of mutiny and sentenced to death. Three were recommended for mercy and were pardoned.

French Revolution

Defence of Toulon

Following the outbreak of the French Revolutionary War, Hood became Commander-in-Chief, Mediterranean Fleet in February 1793. In August 1793 French royalists and other opponents of the revolution took over the city of Toulon and invited Hood, whose fleet was blockading offshore, to occupy the town. Hood, without time to request instructions from the Admiralty in London, moved swiftly to take command of the port.

Hood occupied Toulon on the invitation of the French royalists, and in co-operation with the Spaniards and Sardinians. In December of the same year, the allies, who did not work harmoniously together, were driven out, mainly by the generalship of Napoleon. Hood ordered the French fleet burned to prevent it falling back into the hands of the revolutionary government in Paris.

Corsica

Hood then turned to the occupation of Corsica, which he had been invited to take in the name of the King of Britain by Pasquale Paoli, who had been leader of the Corsican Republic before it was subjugated by the French a quarter of a century previously. The island was for a short time added to the dominions of George III, chiefly by the exertions of the fleet and the co-operation of Paoli. While the occupation of Corsica was being effected, the French at Toulon had so far recovered that they were able to send a fleet to sea. Nelson was recorded as saying that Hood was "the best Officer, take him altogether, that England has to boast of".)

In October, he was recalled to England in consequence of some misunderstanding with the admiralty or the ministry, which has never been explained. Richard Freeman, in his book, The Great Edwardian Naval Feud, explains his relief from command in a quote from Lord Esher's journal. According to this journal, "... [Hood] wrote 'a very temperate letter' to the Admiralty in which he complained that he did not have enough ships to defend the Mediterranean." As a result, Hood was then recalled from the Mediterranean. He was promoted to full admiral on 12 April 1794.

Later career

Samuel Hood was created Viscount Hood of Whitley, Warwickshire in 1796 with a pension of £2000 per year for life (about £ a year in  terms). In 1796, he was also appointed Governour of the Greenwich Hospital, a position which he held until his death in 1816.  He served as Tory Member of Parliament for Westminster from 1784 to 1788 and from 1790 to 1796, and was Member for Reigate between 1789 and 1790. He died in Greenwich on 27 January 1816 and is buried in Greenwich Hospital Cemetery. A peerage of Great Britain was conferred on his wife, Susannah, as Baroness Hood of Catherington in 1795.  Samuel Hood's titles descended to his youngest son, Henry (1753–1836).

There are several portraits of Lord Hood by Lemuel Francis Abbott in the Guildhall and in the National Portrait Gallery. He was also painted by Joshua Reynolds and Thomas Gainsborough.

Marriage and issue
In 1749 he married Susannah Linzee (1726–1806) (whose monument survives at Davenport House, Greenwich (Former Hospital Cemetery)),  a daughter of Edward Linzee, Master Ropemaker at Portsmouth Dockyard, and Mayor of Portsmouth. By his wife he had issue including:
Henry Hood, 2nd Viscount Hood (1753–1836), son and heir.

Legacy
A biographical notice of Hood by McArthur, his secretary during the Mediterranean command, appeared in the Naval Chronicle, vol. ii. His correspondence during his command in America was published by the Navy Records Society.

In 1792, Lieutenant William Broughton, sailing with the expedition of George Vancouver to the Northwest Coast of North America, named Mount Hood in present-day Oregon, and Hood's Canal in present-day Washington, after Hood. Port Hood, Nova Scotia, is also named after him.

Two of the three ships of the Royal Navy named HMS Hood were named after him as well.

See also
Several other members of the Hood family were notable figures in British history:
 Alexander Hood, 1st Viscount Bridport, his brother, was also an Admiral.
 Samuel Hood (1705–1805), his cousin, was a purser.
 Sir Samuel Hood (1762–1814), his cousin once removed, was a Rear Admiral.
 Alexander Hood (1758–1798), brother of Sir Samuel Hood, was killed in the Battle of the Raz de Sein.
 Horace Hood (1870–1916) descended from Admiral Hood, was killed in the Battle of Jutland.
 Samuel Hood, 6th Viscount Hood (1910–1981) descendant of Admiral Hood and inheritor of the viscountcy, Foreign Office official and diplomat.
 List of ships called HMS Hood

References

Sources

Further reading
 Beatson's Naval and Military Memoirs
 James's Naval History, vol. i.
 Troudes, Batailles navales de la France, ii. and iii.
 Chevalier's Histoire de la marine française pendant Ia guerre de l'indépendance américaine and Pendant Ia République.

External links

|-

|-

|-

|-

|-

|-

|-

Hood, Samuel Hood, 1st Viscount
Hood, Samuel Hood, 1st Viscount
Hood, Samuel, 1st Baronet
Hood, Samuel, 1st Baronet
Hood, Samuel Hood, 1st Viscount
Hood, Samuel Hood, 1st Viscount
Hood, Samuel Hood, 1st Viscount
Hood, Samuel Hood, 1st Viscount
Peers of Great Britain created by George III
Peers of Ireland created by George III
Knights Grand Cross of the Order of the Bath
Members of the Parliament of Great Britain for English constituencies
British MPs 1784–1790
British MPs 1790–1796
History of Îles des Saintes
Samuel
Mount Hood
People from Catherington